Swingin' on Broadway is jazz vocalist Gary Williams's third album, recorded at Abbey Road Studios and released in 2008. It is a collection of songs from some of the most famous Broadway musicals.

Critical reception 

The album was released to positive reviews.

Malcolm Laycock of Big Band World gave it five stars and commented: "It’s a well-paced CD of enjoyable variety, skilfully performed. Gary’s in great voice and all’s well. I think I would rate this his best showing to date. Impressive sound balance achieved by producers John Wilson and Mike Dutton."

Clive Fuller of Encore said: "From the opening song “Chim Chim Cheree” from Mary Poppins through to “Always Look on the Bright Side of Life” from Spamalot the pace is well handled both vocally and instrumentally with plenty of opportunity for the soloists to shine... This is a must have CD."

Track listing

Personnel 
Performers
 Gary Williams – vocals
 Clive Dunstall – piano
 Luke Annesley – sax
 Phil Lee – guitar
 Richard Rodney Bennett – celeste
 Justin Woodward – vibraphone

Technical
 Producer – John Wilson
 Executive Producer – Mike Dutton
 Arrangements – Andrew Cottee, Clive Dunstall and Richard Rodney Bennett

References

External links 
 Official Gary Williams web site: Swingin' on Broadway

2008 albums
Gary Williams (singer) albums